The Old Thomas James Store in Mathews Court House, Virginia pre-dates the American Civil War.  It was listed on the National Register of Historic Places (NRHP) in 2008.  It has also been known as The Old Store and as James Store.

It has been moved once or twice in its history, including in 1899, and is now located behind the Sibley's Store.

It is individually listed on the NRHP but is also a contributing property in a historic district that is NRHP-listed, the Sibley's and James Store Historic District.

References

External links
 Thomas James Store - Mathews County Historical Society

Commercial buildings on the National Register of Historic Places in Virginia
Buildings and structures in Mathews County, Virginia
National Register of Historic Places in Mathews County, Virginia
Individually listed contributing properties to historic districts on the National Register in Virginia
Museums in Mathews County, Virginia